Martin Peled-Flax (born July 18, 1958, New York) is an Israeli diplomat who has been Ambassador to Belarus (1998 - 2002), first as Charge d'Affaires a.i. and then as Ambassador Extraordinary and Plenipotentiary.  From 1992 until 1994, he was the Israeli consul in Houston, Texas.

In 2015, he was appointed Minister for Congressional Affairs at the Israeli Embassy in Washington, D.C.

Education
1974-1978 — Touro College (B.A.)
1978-1982 — Jewish Theological Seminary of America (M.A. and Rabbinic Ordination)

References

Touro College alumni
Jewish Theological Seminary of America alumni
Ambassadors of Israel to Belarus
Israeli consuls
Jewish Theological Seminary of America semikhah recipients
1958 births
Living people
21st-century American Jews